Scopula agglomerata is a moth of the family Geometridae. It was described by Claude Herbulot in 1992. It is found in Africa.

References

Moths described in 1992
agglomerata
Taxa named by Claude Herbulot
Moths of Africa